The 1990–91 NBA season was the 21st season for the Portland Trail Blazers in the National Basketball Association. During the off-season, the Blazers acquired Danny Ainge from the Sacramento Kings, and later on traded second-year guard Dražen Petrović to the New Jersey Nets, and acquired Walter Davis from the Denver Nuggets in a three-team midseason trade. The Blazers won their first eleven games of the season, on their way to a franchise best start at a record of 27–3, and holding a 39–9 record at the All-Star break. They would post a 16-game winning streak near the end of the season as they finished with a league best record at 63–19, setting a franchise-high win total that still stands today, and made their ninth consecutive trip to the NBA Playoffs. It was their first Pacific Division title since the 1977–78 season, and ended the Los Angeles Lakers' streak of nine straight years as Pacific Division champions and number-one seed in the Western Conference.

Clyde Drexler averaged 21.5 points, 6.7 rebounds, 6.0 assists and 1.8 steals per game, and was named to the All-NBA Second Team, and finished in sixth place in Most Valuable Player voting, while Terry Porter averaged 17.0 points, 8.0 assists and 2.0 steals per game, and Kevin Duckworth provided the team with 15.8 points and 6.6 rebounds per game. Drexler, Porter and Duckworth were all selected for the 1991 NBA All-Star Game, with head coach Rick Adelman coaching the Western Conference. In addition, Jerome Kersey contributed 14.8 points, 6.6 rebounds and 1.4 steals per game, while Buck Williams provided with 11.7 points and 9.4 rebounds per game, and was named to the NBA All-Defensive First Team. Off the bench, second-year forward Clifford Robinson averaged 11.7 points per game, and Ainge contributed 11.1 points per game. Adelman also finished in second place in Coach of the Year voting.

However, after advancing to the Western Conference Finals with a 3–2 win over the Seattle SuperSonics in the Western Conference First Round, and a 4–1 win over the Utah Jazz in the Western Conference Semi-finals, the Blazers were denied a second straight trip to the NBA Finals, falling to the 3rd-seeded Lakers in six games in the Western Conference Finals. The Lakers would lose in five games to the Chicago Bulls in the NBA Finals.

Following the season, Davis was released to free agency, and re-signed with his former team, the Denver Nuggets.

Draft picks

Roster

Regular season

Season standings

y – clinched division title
x – clinched playoff spot

z – clinched division title
y – clinched division title
x – clinched playoff spot

Record vs. opponents

Game log

Playoffs

| home_wins = 3
| home_losses = 0
| road_wins = 0
| road_losses = 2
}}
|- align="center" bgcolor="#ccffcc"
| 1
| April 26
| Seattle
| W 110–102
| Clyde Drexler (39)
| Kevin Duckworth (13)
| Clyde Drexler (9)
| Memorial Coliseum12,884
| 1–0
|- align="center" bgcolor="#ccffcc"
| 2
| April 28
| Seattle
| W 115–106
| Clyde Drexler (22)
| Kevin Duckworth (10)
| Clyde Drexler (10)
| Memorial Coliseum12,884
| 2–0
|- align="center" bgcolor="#ffcccc"
| 3
| April 30
| @ Seattle
| L 99–102
| Clyde Drexler (23)
| Buck Williams (11)
| Clyde Drexler (11)
| Seattle Center Coliseum14,476
| 2–1
|- align="center" bgcolor="#ffcccc"
| 4
| May 2
| @ Seattle
| L 89–101
| Jerome Kersey (20)
| Williams, Robinson (9)
| Jerome Kersey (5)
| Seattle Center Coliseum13,367
| 2–2
|- align="center" bgcolor="#ccffcc"
| 5
| May 4
| Seattle
| W 119–107
| Terry Porter (23)
| Buck Williams (12)
| Terry Porter (11)
| Memorial Coliseum12,884
| 3–2
|-

| home_wins = 3
| home_losses = 0
| road_wins = 1
| road_losses = 1
}}
|- align="center" bgcolor="#ccffcc"
| 1
| May 7
| Utah
| W 117–97
| Clyde Drexler (20)
| Clyde Drexler (15)
| Terry Porter (9)
| Memorial Coliseum12,884
| 1–0
|- align="center" bgcolor="#ccffcc"
| 2
| May 9
| Utah
| W 118–116
| Jerome Kersey (34)
| Jerome Kersey (6)
| Clyde Drexler (15)
| Memorial Coliseum12,884
| 2–0
|- align="center" bgcolor="#ffcccc"
| 3
| May 11
| @ Utah
| L 101–107
| Terry Porter (28)
| Drexler, Kersey (10)
| Clyde Drexler (7)
| Delta Center12,616
| 2–1
|- align="center" bgcolor="#ccffcc"
| 4
| May 12
| @ Utah
| W 104–101
| Kevin Duckworth (30)
| Duckworth, Drexler (11)
| Clyde Drexler (10)
| Delta Center12,616
| 3–1
|- align="center" bgcolor="#ccffcc"
| 5
| May 14
| Utah
| W 103–96
| Drexler, Porter (22)
| Buck Williams (12)
| Clyde Drexler (8)
| Memorial Coliseum12,884
| 4–1
|-

| home_wins = 2
| home_losses = 1
| road_wins = 0
| road_losses = 3
}}
|- align="center" bgcolor="#ffcccc"
| 1
| May 18
| L.A. Lakers
| L 106–111
| Clyde Drexler (28)
| Buck Williams (10)
| Clyde Drexler (12)
| Memorial Coliseum12,884
| 0–1
|- align="center" bgcolor="#ccffcc"
| 2
| May 21
| L.A. Lakers
| W 109–98
| Terry Porter (26)
| Buck Williams (11)
| Terry Porter (8)
| Memorial Coliseum12,884
| 1–1
|- align="center" bgcolor="#ffcccc"
| 3
| May 24
| @ L.A. Lakers
| L 92–106
| Jerome Kersey (19)
| Buck Williams (11)
| Terry Porter (7)
| Great Western Forum17,505
| 1–2
|- align="center" bgcolor="#ffcccc"
| 4
| May 26
| @ L.A. Lakers
| L 95–116
| Jerome Kersey (25)
| Drexler, Williams (8)
| Terry Porter (10)
| Great Western Forum17,505
| 1–3
|- align="center" bgcolor="#ccffcc"
| 5
| May 28
| L.A. Lakers
| W 95–84
| Jerome Kersey (20)
| Buck Williams (16)
| Clyde Drexler (7)
| Memorial Coliseum12,884
| 2–3
|- align="center" bgcolor="#ffcccc"
| 6
| May 30
| @ L.A. Lakers
| L 90–91
| Terry Porter (24)
| Clyde Drexler (8)
| Clyde Drexler (6)
| Great Western Forum17,505
| 2–4
|-

Player statistics

NOTE: Please write the players statistics in alphabetical order by last name.

Season

Playoffs

Awards and honors
 Clyde Drexler, NBA All-Star, All-NBA Second Team
 Buck Williams, NBA All-Defensive First Team
 Kevin Duckworth, NBA All-Star
 Terry Porter, NBA All-Star

Transactions

References

Portland Trail Blazers seasons
Portland Trail Blazers 1990
Portland Trail Blazers 1990
Port
Port
Port